West of the Pecos is a 1945 American Western film directed by Edward Killy and starring Robert Mitchum and Barbara Hale. It is the second film version of Zane Grey's novel, previously made in 1934 and also titled West of the Pecos starring Richard Dix. It is no relation to the 1922 silent film of the same name.

The previous year, Mitchum had played the lead in another Zane Grey movie with the same screenwriter (Norman Houston) and director titled Nevada, also featuring Richard Martin as comical sidekick Chito Rafferty. Nevada had been Mitchum's first movie as a leading man and the opening titles began with "Introducing Bob Mitchum as Jim Lacy".

Plot
Colonel Lambreth's health is poor, so daughter Rill persuades him to leave his Chicago meat-packing business behind and move to their Texas cattle ranch. Her fiancé, lawyer Clyde Corbin, stays behind.

On the trail, a couple of cowboys, Pecos Smith and sidekick Chito Rafferty, pull up to demand driver Tex Evans pay their back wages. After they ride off, the stagecoach is attacked by bandits. Circling back, the cowboys are told by the mortally wounded Tex that he was shot by Sam Sawtelle.

The stage proceeds to town with Jeff Slinger at the reins. Rill, harassed in town, tucks her hair into her hat and disguises herself as a boy to be left alone.

Brad Sawtelle, brother of Sam, organizes a posse of vigilantes to find Tex's killer. Pecos gets to Sam first and shoots him.

The colonel and Rill get lost en route to their ranch. Pecos and Chito assist them and are offered jobs. Chito tries to woo the Lambreths' maid, Suzanne, but where Rill is concerned, Pecos still doesn't know she's a woman. Corbin comes to Texas and senses that Rill is now in love with someone else.

Brad and his men believe Pecos to be an accomplice in the stagecoach robbery and murder. Pecos proves that the one responsible was Slinger, who is shot dead by Brad. A marshal places Brad under arrest and Rill and Pecos finally get to know each other better.

Cast
 Robert Mitchum as Pecos Smith
 Barbara Hale as Rill Lambeth
 Richard Martin as Chito Rafferty
 Thurston Hall as Colonel Lambeth
 Rita Corday as Suzanne
 Russell Hopton as Jeff Slinger
 Bill Williams as Tex Evans
 Bruce Edwards as Clyde Corbin
 Harry Woods as Brad Sawtelle
 Perc Launders as Sam Sawtelle
 Bryant Washburn as Doc Howard
 Philip Morris as U.S. Marshal
 Martin Garralaga as Don Manuel

Production and Release
The film was popular and earned $151,000 in profits. It was Mitchum's final job before his service in the army.

The previous year, Mitchum had played the lead in another Zane Grey movie with the same screenwriter (Norman Houston) and director titled Nevada, also featuring Richard Martin as comical sidekick Chito Rafferty. Nevada had been Mitchum's first movie as a leading man and the opening titles began with "Introducing Bob Mitchum as Jim Lacy". He was billed as Robert Mitchum for West of the Pecos and for the rest of his extremely long career as a leading man. Both Nevada and West of the Pecos did well at the box office. The latter film was popular and earned $151,000 in profits. It was Mitchum's final job before his service in the army.

Among numerous other roles during her career, Barbara Hale would go on to play "Della Street," Perry Mason's secretary, in the long-running television series Perry Mason (1957-1966) starring Raymond Burr and would later play the role again opposite Burr for thirty TV-movies for a different decade (1985-1995).

References

External links
 

1945 films
1945 Western (genre) films
American black-and-white films
Films shot in Lone Pine, California
American Western (genre) films
Films directed by Edward Killy
Films scored by Paul Sawtell
1940s English-language films
1940s American films